Hanke or Hancke is a surname of Germanic or Scandinavian origin. It is most common in Germany, Denmark, and Sweden, but now widely found in the United States, South Africa, and the United Kingdom.
Hanke is also a male first name in Germany.

People 
 Christopher J. Hanke (b. 1976) actor
 Edith Hancke German stage, film and television actress (1928–2015)
 Gregor Maria Franz Hanke (b. 1954), German Roman catholic bishop
 Henriette Hanke née Arndt (1785–1862), German writer
 Hugon Hanke (1904–1964), former Polish politician
  (1751–1806), Bohemian humanist, writer in Czech and German
 Karl Hanke (1903–1945), Nazi Party official
 Karol Hanke (1903–1964), former Polish football player.
 Lewis Hanke (1905–1993), American historian and professor, father of Latin American Studies
 Mike Hanke (b. 1983), German football player 
 Reginald Hanke (b. 1956), German politician
 Sonya Hanke (1933–1983), Australian classical pianist
 Stephan Hanke (b. 1972), German soccer player
 Steve H. Hanke, economist
 Thaddäus Haenke (1761–1816), explorer
 Brendan Hanke actor

See also 
 Handke
 Henke

Germanic-language surnames

Surnames from given names